Pellmann is a surname. Notable people with the surname include:

Donald Pellmann (1915–2020), American centenarian multi world-record-setting masters athlete
Sören Pellmann (born 1977), German politician

See also
Hellmann
Pollmann